The 2017 División Profesional season (officially the 2017 Copa TIGO-Visión Banco for sponsorship reasons) was the 83rd season of top-flight professional football in Paraguay.

Teams

Stadia and locations

a: Played its Torneo Apertura home games at Estadio Defensores del Chaco due to remodeling works at Estadio General Pablo Rojas.

Managerial changes

Torneo Apertura
The Campeonato de Apertura, also the Copa TIGO-Visión Banco for sponsorship reasons, was the 115th official championship of the Primera División, called "Mario Agustín Sapriza Nunes", and the first championship of the 2017 season. It began on February 3 and ended on June 24.

Standings

Results

Top goalscorers

Source: Soccerway

Torneo Clausura
The Campeonato de Clausura, also the Copa TIGO-Visión Banco for sponsorship reasons, was the 116th official championship of the Primera División, called "Centenario del Club General Díaz - Dr. Hassel Aguilar Sosa", and the second championship of the 2017 season. It began on July 21 and ended on December 10.

Standings

Results

Top goalscorers

Source: Soccerway

Aggregate table

Relegation
Relegation is determined at the end of the season by computing an average of the number of points earned per game over the past three seasons. The two teams with the lowest average were relegated to the División Intermedia for the following season.

 Source: APF

Relegation playoff decider

Since Independiente CG and Rubio Ñu ended with the same average, a match on neutral ground between both teams was played to determine the second relegated team. The loser was relegated to the División Intermedia.

See also
2017 in Paraguayan football

References

External links
APF's official website 

Paraguay
1
Paraguayan Primera División seasons